Coleridge Historic District is a national historic district located at Coleridge, Randolph County, North Carolina. The district encompasses 17 contributing buildings in the Victorian mill village of Coleridge.  It includes buildings built between 1882 and the late 1920s and notable examples of Queen Anne and Romanesque Revival architecture. Notable buildings include the Enterprise Cotton Mill complex, the company store (c. 1910), mill office, Bank of Coleridge, and John Caveness House (c. 1900).

It was added to the National Register of Historic Places in 1976.

References

Historic districts on the National Register of Historic Places in North Carolina
Queen Anne architecture in North Carolina
Romanesque Revival architecture in North Carolina
Buildings and structures in Randolph County, North Carolina
National Register of Historic Places in Randolph County, North Carolina